Louis Hekenui Bidois (28 March 1899–24 May 1955) was a New Zealand policeman. Of Māori descent, he identified with the Ngai Te Rangi and Ngati Ranginui iwi. He was born in Te Puna, Bay of Plenty, New Zealand on 28 March 1899.

References

1899 births
1955 deaths
New Zealand police officers
People from the Bay of Plenty Region
Ngāi Te Rangi people
Ngāti Ranginui people